Tamara Zwart (born 20 February 1975) is a former synchronized swimmer from The Netherlands.

References 

1975 births
Living people
Dutch synchronized swimmers
Olympic synchronized swimmers of the Netherlands
Synchronized swimmers at the 1992 Summer Olympics
Swimmers from Amsterdam